Ariel Prieto (born October 22, 1969) is a Cuban former professional baseball pitcher. He played in Major League Baseball (MLB) from 1995 to 2001 for the Oakland Athletics and Tampa Bay Devil Rays. He is currently the pitching coach for the GCL Mets.

Career
Prieto graduated from Fajardo University in Santiago de Cuba, and immigrated to Puerto Rico soon after. In Puerto Rico he played professional winter league baseball for the first time in his career. As a member of the Cangrejeros de Santurce, Prieto was able to attend the Caribbean World Series for the first time.

After intentionally pitching poorly during the 1994–95 Cuban National Series, Prieto was allowed a visa to leave Cuba in April 1995. He was selected with the fifth overall selection in the 1995 MLB draft by the Oakland Athletics. Prieto made his major league debut for the Athletics that July. Prieto, being unfamiliar with American banks and credit cards walked around with his $1.2 million signing bonus check in his pocket for over a week. He won two games and lost six, becoming one of just a handful of players who were drafted and then played in the big leagues during the same season. In 1996 Prieto had what was arguably his best season, winning 6 games and losing 7 with an ERA of 4.15.

Prieto was traded to the Tampa Bay Devil Rays before the 2001 season. With the Devil Rays, Prieto saw action in three games, without any decisions, allowing one earned run in  innings pitched. His one season with the Devil Rays was his last season in the major leagues. Prieto surfaced in Mexico during the middle 2000s, playing with the Venados de Mazatlán, a team with which he reappeared at the Caribbean World Series, held that year in Venezuela. During six MLB seasons, Prieto won 15 games and lost 24, with a 4.85 ERA.

He played until 2005 in the minor leagues, unable to make it back to the A's.

Coaching career
Prieto spent the 2009 through 2011 seasons as the pitching coach for the Athletics' Arizona League team.

On November 10, 2011, Prieto was announced as the pitching coach for the Vermont Lake Monsters, the Athletics' New York–Penn League (Single A, short season) team.

From 2012 to 2015, Prieto served as interpreter for fellow Cuban defector, New York Mets outfielder  Yoenis Céspedes.

In 2015, Prieto was hired as a coach for the Arizona Diamondbacks. He was let go in 2017.

Prieto was named as the pitching coach for the GCL Mets of the New York Mets organization for the 2018 season.

See also

List of baseball players who defected from Cuba

References

External links

1969 births
Living people
Oakland Athletics players
Tampa Bay Devil Rays players
Oakland Athletics coaches
Major League Baseball players from Cuba
Cuban expatriate baseball players in the United States
Major League Baseball pitchers
Arizona Diamondbacks coaches
Palm Springs Suns players
Edmonton Trappers players
Modesto A's players
Sacramento River Cats players
Durham Bulls players
Nashville Sounds players
Toledo Mud Hens players
Albuquerque Isotopes players
Yaquis de Obregón players
Cuban expatriate baseball players in Mexico
Caribes de Oriente players
Defecting Cuban baseball players
Cuban expatriate baseball players in Venezuela
Cuban expatriate baseball players in Canada
Baseball players from Havana